Kosuke Aita (born October 2, 1998 in Kitami, Hokkaido, Japan) is a Japanese curler.

Personal life
Aita is currently a student at the Kitami Institute of Technology.

Teams and events

Men's

Mixed

Mixed doubles

References

External links

 Team official website 
 Kosuke Aita profile -- Curling World Cup

Living people
1998 births
People from Kitami, Hokkaido
Sportspeople from Hokkaido
Japanese male curlers
Pacific-Asian curling champions

Curlers at the 2016 Winter Youth Olympics